Cheltenham High Street railway station was built by the Midland Railway to serve the north-western part of Cheltenham.

History

The station was situated on the main Birmingham to Bristol railway line, to the south of the bridge where the line passes beneath Tewkesbury Road in Cheltenham, which is a continuation of, but quite remote from that known as the High Street.

It was opened on 1 September 1862 as Cheltenham Tewkesbury Road Bridge, and a month later, on 1 October, was renamed Cheltenham High Street.

The Midland and South Western Junction Railway (MSWJ) had reached Cirencester in 1883. The MSWJ built a locomotive depot adjacent to High Street station.

The station closed to passengers on 1 July 1910.

Stationmasters

William Raggett 1862 - 1875
E. Bradley 1875 - 1877 (afterwards station master at Stretton)
William Raggett 1875 -  1890
Thomas Lee 1891 - 1893
William Willson 1893 - 1902
T.A. Aune 1902 - 1903
T.R. West 1903 - 1905
H.G. Cooper 1905 - 1906
G.H. Goscombe 1906 - 1909 (afterwards station master at Haresfield)

From 1909 until closure the station was managed by the station master at Lansdown Road)

Route

Notes

References

Further reading

Disused railway stations in Gloucestershire
Former Midland Railway stations
Railway stations in Great Britain opened in 1862
Railway stations in Great Britain closed in 1910
1862 establishments in England